Denis Olegovich Baryshnikov (born 26 October 1995) is a Russian football player.

Club career
He made his professional debut in the Russian Professional Football League for FC Lokomotiv-2 Moscow on 22 April 2014 in a game against FC Dolgoprudny.

He made his Russian Football National League debut for FC Tyumen on 5 October 2014 in a game against FC Sibir Novosibirsk.

References

External links
 
 
 

1995 births
People from Balashov
Living people
Russian footballers
Russia youth international footballers
Association football midfielders
FC Tyumen players
FC Khimki players
FC Vityaz Podolsk players
FC Lokomotiv Moscow players
FC Sokol Saratov players
FC Neftekhimik Nizhnekamsk players
Sportspeople from Saratov Oblast